Major Investigation Teams (MIT) are the specialised homicide squads of the Metropolitan Police in London, England.  Forming part of the Homicide and Major Crime Command, there are 24 MITs within the Met. MITs investigate cases of murder, manslaughter, attempted murder where the evidence of intended threat and other investigations identified for specialist needs.

MITs were established in 2000 to replace the former Area Major Incident Pools (AMIPs) as part of Scotland Yard's Serious Crime Group. In 2001, there were 31 murder investigation teams operating in London, made up of 834 police officers, 182 civilian staff, and 14 senior detectives.

Currently, all homicide investigation in London is undertaken by the Specialist Crime and Operations Directorate's Homicide Command, which is split geographically into six units (West, Central, East, Northwest and South), each led by a Detective Superintendent. Each of the Command Units has 4 Major Investigation Teams (MITs), consisting of 50 staff, led by a Detective Chief Inspector (DCI), who performs the role of senior investigating officer (SIO).

References

Metropolitan Police units
Murder investigation